The Light Fingers Stakes is an Australian Turf Club Group 2 Thoroughbred horse race, for three-year-old fillies at set weights, over a distance of 1200 metres at Randwick Racecourse in Sydney, Australia every February.

History
The race is named in honour of the 1965 Melbourne Cup winner Light Fingers.

Grade
1983–1985 - Listed Race
1986 - Group 2
1987–1990 - Group 3
1991 onwards -  Group 2

Distance
 1979–1996 – 1200 metres
 1997–1998 – 1100 metres
 1999–2003 – 1200 metres 
 2004 – 1180 metres
 2005 onwards - 1200 metres

Venue
 1979–2001 - Randwick Racecourse
 2002 - Warwick Farm Racecourse
 2003–2011 - Randwick Racecourse
 2012 - Warwick Farm Racecourse
 2013 - Rosehill Gardens Racecourse
 2014 onwards - Randwick Racecourse

Winners

 2023 - In Secret
 2022 - Fangirl
 2021 - Every Rose
 2020 - Flit
 2019 - Nakeeta Jane
 2018 - Alizee
 2017 - Global Glamour
 2016 - Perignon
 2015 - Adrift
 2014 - Sweet Idea
 2013 - Bennetta
 2012 - Sea Siren
 2011 - Obsequious
 2010 - More Joyous
 2009 - Rock Me Baby
 2008 - Forensics
 2007 - Gold Edition
 2006 - Street Smart
 2005 - Trezevant
 2004 - Sharp
 2003 - Only Glory
 2002 - Ancient Song
 2001 - Lady Mulan
 2000 - Camena
 1999 - Rubicall
 1998 - Staging
 1997 - Assertive Lass
 1996 - Peruzzi
 1995 - Flight To Fantasy
 1994 - Gem Of The West
 1993 - Skating
 1992 - Office
 1991 - Whisked
 1990 - Joanne
 1989 - Paris Miss
 1988 - Here's The Point
 1987 - Magic Flute
 1986 - Shinakima
 1985 - Rivage
 1984 - Sabre Dancer
 1983 - Emancipation
 1982 - Playing Our Song
 1981 - Shaybisc

See also
 List of Australian Group races
 Group races

External links 
First three placegetters Light Fingers Stakes (ATC)

References

Horse races in Australia
Randwick Racecourse